Anneleen Van Bossuyt (born 10 January 1980 in Ghent) was a Belgian Member of the European Parliament (MEP) from January 2015 to July 2019 for the New Flemish Alliance (N-VA), part of the European Conservatives and Reformists group. She succeeded Louis Ide.

She was a member of the Committee on the Internal Market and Consumer Protection (IMCO), of which she was the chair from June 2017 to the end of the term. She also was a member of the delegation for relations with the United States.

Van Bossuyt was N-VA's main candidate in the Ghent municipal elections of October 2018 and is since a member of the Ghent City Council. She was also N-VA's main candidate in the federal elections of 2019 where she ran on the list for East Flanders, and since holds a seat in the Chamber of Representatives.

External links
 Personal website

References

1980 births
Living people
Politicians from Ghent
New Flemish Alliance MEPs
MEPs for Belgium 2014–2019